is a feminine Japanese given name.

People with this name include:
, Japanese manga artist
, Japanese volleyball player
, Japanese volleyball player
, Japanese voice actress
, Japanese voice actress
, first Japanese woman to win the Miss International pageant
, Japanese fashion model, gravure idol and actress
, Japanese video game artist
Ikumi Oeda (born 1993), Thai judoka

References

 
Japanese feminine given names